The District Council (First) functional constituency, formerly called District Council until 2012, was a functional constituency in the elections for the Legislative Council of Hong Kong. Its electorate consists of all 431 directly elected members (excluding the 27 ex officio seats held by chairpersons of rural committees) of the 18 District Councils of Hong Kong. Along with Catering, it was created in 2000 to replace the Urban Council and Regional Council constituencies after the councils were abolished. This constituency was abolished in 2021.

Members returned

Election results

2010s

2000s

References

Constituencies of Hong Kong
Constituencies of Hong Kong Legislative Council
Functional constituencies (Hong Kong)
2000 establishments in Hong Kong
Constituencies established in 2000